Jehoahaz or Joachaz (Iōakhaz) was the name of several people mentioned in the Hebrew Bible.

 Jehoahaz of Israel (815–801 BC or 814–798 BC), eleventh king of Israel and son of Jehu
 Jehoahaz of Judah (633/632–609 BC), seventeenth king of Judah and son of Josiah (Jehoahaz III of Judah)
 The youngest son of Jehoram, king of Judah (2 Chronicles 21:17; 22:1, 6, 8, 9), more commonly known as Ahaziah (Jehoahaz I of Judah)
 The full name of Ahaz of Judah, by which he is mentioned in the annals of Tiglath-Pileser III (Jehoahaz II of Judah)

Monarchs of the Hebrew Bible